LY-2452473 (TT-701) is a drug which acts as a selective androgen receptor modulator (SARM). It has been investigated for the treatment of erectile dysfunction and symptoms associated with benign prostate hyperplasia.

See also
 Enobosarm
 JNJ-28330835
 Ligandrol

References 

Selective androgen receptor modulators